Yakovlevsky District is an administrative district (raion), one of the twenty-one in Belgorod Oblast, Russia. As a municipal division, it is incorporated as Yakovlevsky Municipal District. It is located in the west of the oblast. Its administrative center is the town of Stroitel. Population:  51,409 (2002 Census);  The population of Stroitel accounts for 41.4% of the district's total population.

References

Notes

Sources

Districts of Belgorod Oblast